Pixy Stix are a sweet and sour colored powdered candy usually packaged in a wrapper that resembles a drinking straw. 

The candy is usually poured into the mouth from the wrapper, which is made out of plastic or paper. Pixy Stix contain dextrose, citric acid, and artificial and natural flavors.

History 
Pixy Stix were invented by Sunline Inc. in St. Louis, Missouri. The concept for this powdered candy originated in 1942 and was derived from a penny drink mix sold as Fruzola Jr. by the Fruzola Company in Salt Lake City, Utah. When J. Fish Smith found that children were eating the sweet and sour powder straight from the package, he modified the formula and branded it as Lik-M-Aid. 

An affiliated company, Fruzola Company of St. Louis, which later became Sunline, Inc., was founded in 1952 by Menlo F. Smith to manufacture and market Lik-M-Aid nationwide. In 1959, the product was packaged in color-striped straws and introduced as Pixy Stix. Several years later, Lik-M-Aid was modified with a multi-compartment package containing two flavors and a candy stick used to dip the candy out of the package, thereby dubbed Fun Dip. Pixy Stix are currently manufactured by Ferrero Candy Company , a division of Ferrero SpA.

Flavors
 Grape
 Maui Slap/Punch (Blue Raspberry)
 Orange
 Cherry
 Strawberry
 Cucumber Watermelon
 Mango Lime
 Pineapple

See also
 Sherbet – a fizzy powder similar to that found in Pixy Stix
 Ronald Clark O'Bryan - a man who killed his son using a poisoned Pixy Stix

References

The Willy Wonka Candy Company brands
Products introduced in 1952
Brand name confectionery
Candy
Powders